The Matthias Corvinus Monument is a monument in Cluj-Napoca, Romania.

This classified historic monument, conceived by János Fadrusz and opened in 1902, represents Matthias Corvinus. It is listed in the National Register of Historic Monuments in Romania, classified with number CJ-III-m-A-07819. After casting the sculpture in bronze in the ore foundry, another small plaster model was made and sent to the World Exhibition in Paris. The plaster sample has been awarded the Grand Prix, the highest award at the World Expo.

See also
 Wesselényi Monument

Notes and references

External links

Buildings and structures completed in 1902
1902 in Hungary
Monuments and memorials in Cluj-Napoca
Outdoor sculptures in Romania
Historic monuments in Cluj County
János Fadrusz
Equestrian statues in Romania
Bronze sculptures in Romania
Statues of monarchs
Statues of military officers